Johan Brunström and Raven Klaasen were the defending champions but decided not to participate.

Oliver Marach and Florin Mergea won the title, defeating František Čermák and Philipp Oswald 6–4, 6–3 in the final.

Seeds

Draw

Draw

References
 Main Draw

Geneva Open Challenger - Doubles
2013 Doubles